Lepteucosma srinagara is a species of moth of the family Tortricidae. It is found in Jammu and Kashmir in India.

The ground colour of the forewings is white, preserved submedially and in the terminal area from beneath the apex to the tornus. The anterior part of the wings is strongly suffused with brown. The hindwings are brownish grey.

Etymology
The species name refers to Srinagar, the collecting locality.

References

External links

Moths described in 2006
Moths of Asia
Eucosmini
Taxa named by Józef Razowski